A short take-off and vertical landing aircraft (STOVL aircraft) is a fixed-wing aircraft that is able to take off from a short runway (or take off vertically if it does not have a heavy payload) and land vertically (i.e. with no runway). The formal NATO definition (since 1991) is:

On aircraft carriers, non-catapult-assisted, fixed-wing short takeoffs are accomplished with the use of thrust vectoring, which may also be used in conjunction with a runway "ski-jump". There are currently 14 aircraft carriers that operate these STOVL aircraft (United States [9], United Kingdom [2], Italy [2], and Spain [1]). Use of STOVL tends to allow aircraft to carry a larger payload compared to vertical take-off and landing (VTOL), while still only requiring a short runway. The most famous examples are the Hawker Siddeley Harrier and the Sea Harrier. Although technically VTOL aircraft, they are operationally STOVL aircraft due to the extra weight carried at take-off for fuel and armaments. The same is true of the F-35B Lightning II, which demonstrated VTOL capability in test flights but is operationally a STOVL.

History

In 1951, the Lockheed XFV and the Convair XFY Pogo tailsitters were both designed around the Allison YT40 turboprop engine driving contra-rotating propellers.

The British Hawker P.1127 took off vertically in 1960, and demonstrated conventional take-off in 1961. It was developed into the Hawker Siddeley Harrier which flew in 1967.

In 1962, Lockheed built the XV-4 Hummingbird for the U.S. Army. It sought to "augment" available thrust by injecting the engine exhaust into an ejector pump in the fuselage. First flying vertically in 1963, it suffered a fatal crash in 1964. It was converted into the XV-4B Hummingbird for the U.S. Air Force as a testbed for separate, vertically mounted lift engines, similar to those used in the Yak-38 Forger. That plane flew and later crashed in 1969. The Ryan XV-5 Vertifan, which was also built for the U.S. Army at the same time as the Hummingbird, experimented with gas-driven lift fans. That plane used fans in the nose and each wing, covered by doors which resembled half garbage can lids when raised. However, it crashed twice, and proved to generate a disappointing amount of lift, and was difficult to transition to horizontal flight.

Of dozens of VTOL and V/STOL designs tried from the 1950s to 1980s, only the subsonic Hawker Siddeley Harrier and Yak-38 Forger reached operational status, with the Forger being withdrawn after the fall of the Soviet Union.

Rockwell International built, and then abandoned, the Rockwell XFV-12 supersonic fighter which had an unusual wing which opened up like window blinds to create an ejector pump for vertical flight. It never generated enough lift to get off the ground despite developing 20,000 lbf of thrust. The French had a nominally Mach 2 Dassault Mirage IIIV fitted with no less than 8 lift engines that flew (and crashed), but did not have enough space for fuel or payload for combat missions. The German EWR VJ 101 used swiveling engines mounted on the wingtips with fuselage mounted lift engines, and the VJ 101C X1 reached supersonic flight (Mach 1.08) on 29 July 1964. The supersonic Hawker Siddeley P.1154, which competed with the Mirage IIIV for use in NATO, was cancelled even as the aircraft were being built.

NASA uses the abbreviation SSTOVL for Supersonic Short Take-Off / Vertical Landing, and as of 2012, the X-35B/F-35B are the only aircraft to conform with this combination within one flight.

The experimental Mach 1.7 Yakovlev Yak-141 did not find an operational customer, but similar rotating rear nozzle technology is used on the F-35B. The F-35B Lightning II entered service on 31 July 2015. 

Larger STOVL designs were considered, the Armstrong Whitworth AW.681 cargo aircraft was under development when cancelled in 1965. The Dornier Do 31 got as far as three experimental aircraft before cancellation in 1970.

Although mostly a VTOL design, the V-22 Osprey has increased payload when taking off from a short runway.

References

STOL aircraft
VTOL aircraft
Types of take-off and landing